The following is a list of awards and nominations received by American actress and producer Viola Davis. For her work on television, she has won a Primetime Emmy Award and two Screen Actors Guild Awards. For her work in the theatre, she has won two Tony Awards and three Drama Desk Awards. For her work in film, she has won an Academy Award, a British Academy Film Award, a Golden Globe Award, three Critics' Choice Movie Awards, and four Screen Actors Guild Awards, tied with Renée Zellweger for the most film wins for an actress, and with six overall wins, she is the most awarded African-American at the Screen Actors Guild Awards. Additionally, she is a four-time Academy Award nominee, the most nominated black actress in history. She is one of the few performers to have won the four major American entertainment awards (EGOT), and only the third to achieve both EGOT and Triple Crown of Acting, after Helen Hayes and Rita Moreno.

Major industry awards

Academy Awards
The Academy Awards are a set of awards given by the Academy of Motion Picture Arts and Sciences annually for excellence of cinematic achievements.

BAFTA Awards
The BAFTA Awards is an annual award show presented by the British Academy of Film and Television Arts.

Golden Globe Awards
The Golden Globe Award is an accolade bestowed by the Hollywood Foreign Press Association (HFPA) recognizing excellence in film and television.

Grammy Awards
The Grammys are annual awards presented by The National Academy of Recording Arts & Sciences.

Primetime Emmy Awards
The Primetime Emmy Award is an American award bestowed by the Academy of Television Arts & Sciences in recognition of excellence in American primetime television programming.

Screen Actors Guild Awards
The Screen Actors Guild Awards are organized by the Screen Actors Guild‐American Federation of Television and Radio Artists. First awarded in 1995, the awards aim to recognize excellent achievements in film and television.

Tony Awards
The Antoinette Perry Award for Excellence in Theatre, more commonly known as the Tony Award, recognizes achievement in live Broadway theatre. The awards are presented by the American Theatre Wing and The Broadway League at an annual ceremony in New York City. Davis has won two awards from three nominations, all for performances in plays by August Wilson.

Other awards

AACTA Awards
The AACTA Awards are presented annually by the Australian Academy of Cinema and Television Arts (AACTA) to recognize and honor achievements in the film and television industry.

AARP’s Movies for Grownups Awards
The AARP Movies for Grownups Awards recognizes achievements of those in the entertainment industry age 50 and over, and the films that speak to that vast audience, as well as supports the overall goals of the AARP.

American Film Institute Awards
The American Film Institute Awards (also known as the AFI Awards) are awards presented by the American Film Institute to recognize the top 10 films and television programs of the year.

American Society of Cinematographers
The American Society of Cinematographers was founded in 1919 to advance the science and art of cinematography and gather a wide range of cinematographers to discuss techniques and ideas and to advocate for motion pictures as a type of art form.

Audie Awards
The Audie Awards are awards presented annually by the Audio Publishers Association (APA) to recognize achievement in spoken word, particularly audiobook narration and audiodrama performance, published in the United States of America.

BET Awards
The BET Awards were established in 2001 by the Black Entertainment Television network to celebrate African Americans and other minorities in music, acting, sports, and other fields of entertainment over the past year.

Black Reel Awards
The Black Reel Awards is an annual American awards ceremony hosted by the Foundation for the Augmentation of African-Americans in Film (FAAAF) to recognize excellence in African-American, as well as those of African diaspora's cinematic achievements in the around the world film industry as assessed by the Academy's voting membership.

Black Reel Awards for Television
The Black Reel Awards for Television is an annual American awards ceremony hosted by the Foundation for the Augmentation of African-Americans in Film (FAAAF) honoring the achievements of African-Americans and of the African Diaspora in television.

Cannes Film Festival
The Cannes Film Festival is an annual film festival held in Cannes, France, which previews new films of all genres, including documentaries, from all around the world.

CinemaCon Award

Critics' Choice Movie Awards
The Critics' Choice Movie Awards (formerly known as the Broadcast Film Critics Association Award) is an awards show presented annually by the Critics Choice Association (CCA) to honor the finest in cinematic achievement.

Critics' Choice Super Awards
The Critics' Choice Super Awards is an awards show presented annually by the Critics Choice Association to honor the finest in genre fiction film, television and home media releases, including action, superhero, horror, science fiction, fantasy and animation releases.

Critics' Choice Television Awards
The Critics' Choice Television Awards are accolades that are presented annually by the Broadcast Television Journalists Association (BTJA).

Dorian Awards
The Dorian Awards are organized by the Gay and Lesbian Entertainment Critics Association (GALECA).

Drama Desk Awards
The Drama Desk Awards are presented annually by The Drama Desk Organisation, and were first awarded in 1955 to recognize excellence in New York theatre productions on Broadway, Off-Broadway, and Off-Off-Broadway.

Film at Lincoln Center

Gotham Awards
The Gotham Independent Film Awards are American film awards, presented annually to the makers of independent films.

Hasty Pudding Theatricals
The Hasty Pudding Woman of the Year award has been bestowed annually by the Hasty Pudding Theatricals society at Harvard University, since 1951.

Hollywood Film Awards
The Hollywood Film Awards are an American motion picture award ceremony held annually since 1997.

Hollywood Walk of Fame
The Hollywood Walk of Fame awards people of notability in the film, television, music, radio and theatre industry.

Independent Spirit Awards
The Independent Spirit Awards, founded in 1984, are awards dedicated to independent filmmakers.

Lucille Lortel Awards
The Lucille Lortel Awards recognize excellence in New York Off-Broadway theatre. The awards are named for Lucille Lortel, an actress and theater producer, and have been awarded since 1986.

MTV Movie & TV Awards
The MTV Movie & TV Awards is a film and television awards show presented annually on MTV. The nominees are decided by producers and executives at MTV. Winners are decided online by the general public. Presently voting is done through MTV's official website.

NAACP Image Awards
The NAACP Image Award is annually presented to people of color in film, television, music, and literature.

National Board of Review
The National Board of Review was founded in 1909 in New York City to award "film, domestic and foreign, as both art and entertainment".

Obie Awards
The Obie Awards or Off-Broadway Theater Awards are annual awards originally given by The Village Voice newspaper to theatre artists and groups in New York City. As the Tony Awards cover Broadway productions, the Obie Awards cover Off-Broadway and Off-Off-Broadway productions.

Outer Critics Circle Awards
The Outer Critics Circle Awards are presented annually for theatrical achievements both on Broadway and Off-Broadway. They were begun during the 1949-1950 theatre season. The awards are decided upon by theatre critics who review for out-of-town newspapers, national publications, and other media outlets outside of New York City.

Palm Springs International Film Festival
The Palm Springs International Film Festival is an annual film festival held in Palm Springs, California since 1989.

People's Choice Awards
The People's Choice Awards is an American awards show recognizing the people and the work of popular culture. The show has been held annually since 1975 and is voted on by the general public.

Santa Barbara International Film Festival
The Santa Barbara International Film Festival is an eleven day film festival held in Santa Barbara, California since 1986.

Satellite Awards
The Satellite Awards are a set of annual awards given by the International Press Academy. Davis has won two awards from four nominations.

Saturn Awards
The Saturn Awards are a set of annual awards given by the Academy of Science Fiction, Fantasy and Horror Films recognizing the best of film and television in those genres.

Teen Choice Awards
The Teen Choice Awards is an annual awards show that airs on the Fox television network. The awards honor the year's biggest achievements in music, movies, sports, television, fashion, and more, voted by adolescent viewers (ages 10 to 15).

Television Critics Association Awards
The TCA Awards are awarded annually by the Television Critics Association for outstanding achievements in television.

Theatre World Award
The Theatre World Award is an American honor presented annually to actors and actresses in recognition of an outstanding New York City stage debut performance, either on Broadway or off-Broadway. It was first awarded for the 1945-1946 theatre season.

Women in Film Crystal + Lucy Awards
First presented in 1977 by the Women in Film organization, Women in Film Crystal + Lucy Awards are presented to honor women in communications and media.

Critics associations

See also
 Viola Davis on screen and stage

Notes

References

Davis, Viola